Michael Mastro (born May 17, 1962) is an American Broadway and film actor.<ref>The New York Times Theater Reviews 1997-1998 - Page 243 New York Times - 2001 "Three musicians, played by Frank Wood, Michael Mastro and Joseph Lyfe Taylor, sit around a cassette player listening to the tape of a fervent, wrenching trumpet solo."</ref>

Mastro made his Broadway debut in Terrence McNally's Love! Valour! Compassion! in 1995. His film appearances include roles in Kissing Jessica Stein, The Night We Never Met (1993), Jungle 2 Jungle (1997),  and Borough of Kings'' (2002).

References

External links
 
 
 
 

1962 births
Actors from Albany, New York
American male actors
Living people